Weston (postcode: 2611) is a suburb of Canberra, Australian Capital Territory, Australia.

Weston was named after a former homestead built in the area sometime around 1835. The Weston Creek grant was once held by Captain Edward Weston the Superintendent of the Hyde Park Barracks, Sydney. Streets in Weston are named after artists.

Suburb amenities

Weston Creek Centre
Weston contains the central shopping area of the Weston Creek district, which includes the Cooleman Court shopping centre. Other facilities in the Weston Creek centre include a post office, petrol station, restaurants, clubs, real estate agents and many other specialty shops.

Churches
St Peters (Anglican church)
 Baháʼí Faith
 Church of Christ (non-denominational)
 Presbyterian
 Uniting Church in Australia
 Sikh temple-Gurduara

Educational institutions
 Orana School 
 Canberra Institute of Technology
 Islamic School of Canberra

Australian Defence College 
The Australian Defence College's Centre for Defence and Strategic Studies (CDSS) and Australian Command and Staff College (ACSC) are both located at Weston Creek.

Geology

Deakin Volcanics green grey and purple rhyodacite mostly covers Weston. The Deakin Volcanics green grey, purple and cream rhyolite can be seen between Parkinson St and Namatjira Drive and forms a large outcrop in the park to the east of Cooleman Court. A band of pink and green rhyolitic instrusive porphyry runs across Weston from west to east. It is fault uplifted on the southern side. Deakin Volcanics red-purple and green-grey rhyodacite with spherulitic texture is along Hindmarsh Drive on the southern border of the suburb.

References

Suburbs of Canberra